Dali Fengyi Airport  is an airport in Dali City, Yunnan, China, just outside Xiaguan Town.

Airlines and destinations

Facilities

The airport has a single terminal building, with additional buildings located near the terminal building. The west side of the airport features a message on a hill welcoming visitors, which is visible from the air.

See also
List of airports in the People's Republic of China

References

External links
 Yunnan Airport Group - Reference
 
 Airports in China from AirfieldMaps.co.uk
 Dali Airport Departures, Arrivals, and Information

Airports in Yunnan
Transport in Dali Bai Autonomous Prefecture